Jessica Magdalena Therese Almenäs (born 16 November 1975) is a Swedish television presenter and reporter. She presents the horse racing show Vinnare V75 and between 2008 and 2016 the celebrity dancing show Let's Dance, both broadcast on TV4.

Almenäs finished first runner-up in Miss Sweden 1998 and went on to represent her country in Miss World that year. She has presented Nyhetsmorgon. Along with Adam Alsing she presented the football awards show Fotbollsgalan in 2006, 2007, 2008 and 2009. She presented Kristallen in 2008, and was the reporter interviewing the celebrity guests at Kristallen 2014.

In 2011 and 2012, Almenäs presented the show Biggest Loser on TV4.  She is a former basketball player and has played at elite level for Brahe Basket.

In September 2016, Almenäs revealed that she would start to work for Kanal 5, and would end her contract with TV4.

Personal life 
She also has a son born in 2009 with the Norwegian horse rider Tony André Hansen. She is cousin with the NHL player Oskar Sundqvist.

References

External links 

Miss World 1998 delegates
1975 births
Living people
Swedish beauty pageant winners
People from Jokkmokk Municipality
Swedish television hosts
Swedish women television presenters
20th-century Swedish women